The Battle of Otterburn took place according to Scottish sources on 5 August 1388, or 19 August according to English sources, as part of the continuing border skirmishes between the Scots and English.

The best remaining record of the battle is from Jean Froissart's Chronicles in which he claims to have interviewed veterans from both sides of the battle. His account is still regarded with some concern as details, such as the distance between Newcastle upon Tyne and Otterburn, are incorrect.

The Scottish noble James, 2nd Earl of Douglas decided to lead a raid—one of a continuing series on both sides of the border—into English territory. It was timed to take advantage of divisions on the English side between Ralph Neville, 1st Earl of Westmorland and Henry Percy, 1st Earl of Northumberland who had just taken over defence of the border.

The battle
The Scots divided their forces, with the main force and their baggage train heading towards Carlisle, while a raiding party under the Earl of Douglas ravaged the countryside around Durham and Newcastle. Northumberland sent his two sons Harry Hotspur and Sir Ralph Percy to engage while he stayed at Alnwick to cut off the marauders' retreat.

Froissart says that the first fighting included a meeting of the Earl of Douglas and Henry Percy in hand-to-hand combat, in which Percy's pennon was captured. Douglas then moved off destroying the castle at Ponteland and besieging Otterburn Castle (now Otterburn Tower). Percy attacked Douglas's encampment with a surprise attack in the late afternoon, but first encountered the Earl's serving men, giving the bulk of the forces time to muster and attack them on their flank.

Douglas led the left wing, while John Dunbar, Earl of Moray led the right. Hotspur's men, having ridden up from Newcastle, were tired and disorganized as they made their way onto the field. Hotspur was so overly confident that he attacked the Scots while the rest of his force was still marching up through Otterburn.

During the battle on a moonlit night Douglas was killed; his death had no influence on the outcome of the battle and went unnoticed until much later. The Percys were both captured. Sir John Montgomery, 9th of Eaglesham, captured Henry Percy (later using the ransom to build Polnoon Castle) with the remaining English force retreating to Newcastle. Despite Percy's force having an estimated three to one advantage over the Scots, Froissart records 1,040 English were captured and 1,860 killed whereas 200 Scots were captured and 100 were killed. The Westminster Chronicle estimates Scottish casualties at around 500.

Some have suggested that Hotspur's rashness and eagerness to engage the Scots and the added tiredness of the English army after its long march north, were without doubt, the reasons for English defeat, despite having a three to one advantage in numbers. It is possible that the reasons for this defeat may be more complex, however.

Aftermath
Such a decisive victory kept the two sides apart for some time. Of such renown was the battle of Otterburn that several ballads were composed in its honour including The Battle of Otterburn and The Ballad of Chevy Chase (Child ballads 161 and 162). Chevy Chase rather mangles the history of the battle and may be confusing other conflicts at around the same time but it is still cited as one of the best of the ancient ballads.

The Percy Cross, located just off the A696, was erected before 1400 to commemorate the Battle of Otterburn.

Houses involved in the battle
Some of the various Scottish Lowland families involved in this battle were the Clan Hall Swintons, Johnstones, Grahams, Gordons, Lindsays, Leslies, Herons, and Montgomerys.

References

Notes

Sources
Primary

Froissart, Jean, Chronicles, 1903 ed.
Hardyng, John, Chronicles, 1812.
Pluscarden, the Book of, ed. F. H. Skene, 1880.
The Westminster Chronicle, 1381-1394, ed. and trans. by L. C. Hector and B. F. Harvey, 1982.
Wyntoun, Andrew of, Origynal Chronicle of Scotland, ed F. J. Amours, 1908.

Secondary
Fonblanque, E. B., Annals of the House of Percy, London 1887.
Grant, A., The Otterburn War from a Scottish Point of View, in War and Border Societies in the Middle Ages, ed A. Goodman and A. Took, 1992.
Robson, J., Border Battles and Battlefields, 1897.
Tyson, C, The Battle of Otterburn: When and Where was it Fought?, in War And Border Societies, see above.
Walton, R. H., The Otterburn Story, in History of the Berwickshire Naturalist Club, vol. 35, 1961.
Wesencraft, C. F., The Battle of Otterburn, 1988.
White, R. H., The History of the Battle of Otterburn, 1857.

External links
Froissart's account of the battle
 for Percy's Cross which marks the battlefield

1388 in England
1388 in Scotland
Conflicts in 1388
Battles between England and Scotland
Military history of Northumberland
Battle of Otterburn
Registered historic battlefields in England
Battles of the Middle Ages
Otterburn, Northumberland
Night battles
Otterburn
Otterburn